Velappan is a surname. Notable people with the surname include:

C. V. Velappan, Indian politician
Peter Velappan (1935–2018), Malaysian football executive